Ångardsvatnet is a lake in the municipality of Oppdal in Trøndelag county, Norway. It is surrounded by the Trollheimen mountain range including the mountains Gråfjellet, Kråkvasstind, and Lorthøa to the south and Bårdsgardskammen and Okla to the north. The lake Gjevillvatnet lies in the next valley to the north of Ångardsvatnet.

Regulation
The lake was regulated in connection with the development of Driva power plant, which opened in 1973. After the smaller lake Dalsvatnet, the water flows through a dam into the river Vindøla and it then flows east to the river Driva at the village of Lønset. The regulation of the two lakes has resulted in very little water flow in the river Vindøla for parts of the year.

Uses
The lake Ångardsvatnet offers good swimming and other activities such as fishing and boating during the summer. Surrounding landowners lease out fishing rights and sell fishing permits for sports fishing in the summers. In the winter, the lake offers groomed ski trails and good opportunities for ice fishing. There is an annual ice fishing contest around Easter each year.

See also
List of lakes in Norway

References

Oppdal
Lakes of Trøndelag